The M9 is a major motorway in Scotland.  It runs from the outskirts of Edinburgh, bypassing the towns of Linlithgow, Falkirk, Grangemouth and Stirling to end at Dunblane.

History
The first section was Polmont and Falkirk Bypass which opened on 28 August 1968 This was followed by the Newbridge Bypass which opened on 25 November 1970, the third section Lathalllan to Muriehall (Linlithgow), which joined the two together opened on 18 December 1972

Route 

It meets the A8 at Newbridge – a traffic blackspot before the junction was grade separated. Its next junction is with the M90, the first part of which used to be a spur of the M9 towards the Forth Road Bridge. This spur ended at the single carriageway A8000 road  short of the bridge, but was extended in September 2007 to meet the A90 at Scotstoun.

At Stirling it meets the M80 (junction 9 of both motorways), taking over the main route through the Carse of Lecropt to the final roundabout at Dunblane. From there, the A9 runs all the way to Thurso. Moto services are located at the M9/M80 junction, accessed via a roundabout which allows access to all routes.

Junctions

See also 
 List of motorways in the United Kingdom

References

External links 

 Scottish Roads Archive - the M9 Motorway
 City of Edinburgh Council Leaflet (PDF)
 The Motorway Archive – M9

Motorways in Scotland
Transport in Edinburgh
Transport in Stirling (council area)
Transport in West Lothian